The Kardzhali Hydro Power Plant is an active hydro power near Kardzhali, southern Bulgaria constructed on the dam of the same name on the river Arda. It has 3 individual turbines with a nominal output of around 36 MW which deliver up to 108 MW of power.

Together with the Ivailovgrad HPP and Studen Kladenets HPP, Kardzhali HPP forms the Dolna Arda Hydro Cascade with total capacity of 276 MW. There is a 65,000,000 euro modernization plan for the three power plants.

External links

References

Hydroelectric power stations in Bulgaria
Buildings and structures in Kardzhali Province
Kardzhali